George Harry Palmer (24 October 1917 –  11 March 2012) was an English cricketer. Palmer was a right-handed batsman who bowled right-arm medium pace. He was born at Ibstock, Leicestershire.

Palmer made his first-class debut for Leicestershire against Worcestershire in the 1938 County Championship at Park Road, Loughborough. He made four further first-class appearances for the county, the last of which came against Hampshire in the 1939 County Championship. In his five matches, he took 12 wickets at an average of 26.66, with best figures of 3/36. With the bat he scored 31 runs at an average of 6.20, with a high score of 14 not out.

His father John also played first-class cricket.

References

External links
George Palmer at ESPNcricinfo
George Palmer at CricketArchive

1917 births
2012 deaths
People from Ibstock
Cricketers from Leicestershire
English cricketers
Leicestershire cricketers